The 2023 Summit League softball tournament will take place from May 10-13, 2023. The top six regular-season finishers of the league's eight teams will meet in the modified double-elimination tournament at Jackrabbit Softball Stadium on the campus of South Dakota State University in Brookings, South Dakota. The winner of the tournament will earn the Summit League's automatic bid to the 2023 NCAA Division I softball tournament.

Standings

 St. Thomas is ineligible for NCAA tournament through 2026
Reference:

Format and seeding
The top six finishers from the regular season were seeded one through six based on conference winning percentage during the conference's regular season. The tournament will play out as a modified double-elimination tournament, with the bottom four seeds playing each other in the single-elimination first round and the rest of the tournament as a double-elimination.

Schedule

References

2023 in sports in South Dakota